The Central District of Kazerun County is a district (bakhsh) in Kazerun County, Fars Province, Iran. At the 2006 census, its population was 128,945, in 30,257 families.  The District has one city: Kazeroon. The District has three rural districts (dehestan): Balyan Rural District, Deris Rural District, and Shapur Rural District.

References 

Kazerun County
Districts of Fars Province